In public transport, Route 8 may refer to:

Route 8 (MTA Maryland), a bus route in Baltimore, Maryland and its suburbs
Barcelona Metro line 8
Line 8 (Madrid Metro)
NWFB Route 8, a bus route in Hong Kong
London Buses route 8
Seoul Subway Line 8
Melbourne tram route 8, ceased April 2017

8